Wellington Street West is a 2.3 km road and shopping area  west of downtown Ottawa, Ontario. This road was once connected to - and is often confused with - the prominent Wellington Street in downtown Ottawa. But the two Wellingtons were severed in the 1960s with the expropriation of LeBreton Flats and the demolition of the viaduct that connected them over the Canadian Pacific Railway tracks.

A small remnant of the old Wellington alignment remains between Bayview Road and the small park, Somerset Square. But the modern Wellington Street West roadway is now connected with Somerset Street West, which becomes Wellington West at Garland Avenue.

The section from Somerset Street West to Holland Avenue traverses the Hintonburg neighbourhood, while the section from Holland Avenue to Island Park Drive forms the backbone of the Wellington Village community.  At Island Park Drive, the roadway changes its name again to Richmond Road.

The entire Wellington Street West corridor and the surrounding shopping district contain more than 500 individual businesses and restaurants. Since 2008, these have been represented by the Wellington West Business Improvement Area.

Major intersections
The following is a list of major intersections along Wellington Street West, listed from east to west:
 Bayview Road
 Somerset Street West
 Fairmont Avenue
 Melrose Avenue
 Carruthers Avenue
 Parkdale Avenue
 Holland Avenue
 Harmer Avenue North
 Clarendon Avenue
 Western Avenue
 Island Park Drive

Notes 

Roads in Ottawa